In enzymology, an ADP-sugar diphosphatase is an enzyme that catalyzes the chemical reaction

ADP-sugar + H2O  AMP + alpha-D-aldose 1-phosphate

Thus, the two substrates of this enzyme are ADP-sugar and H2O, whereas its two products are AMP and alpha-D-aldose 1-phosphate.

This enzyme belongs to the family of hydrolases, specifically those acting on acid anhydrides in phosphorus-containing anhydrides.  The systematic name of this enzyme class is ADP-sugar sugarphosphohydrolase. Other names in common use include ADP-sugar pyrophosphatase, and adenosine diphosphosugar pyrophosphatase.  This enzyme participates in 3 metabolic pathways: fructose and mannose metabolism, purine metabolism, and starch and sucrose metabolism.

References

 

EC 3.6.1
Enzymes of unknown structure